Jacques Marescaux (born August 8, 1948) is a French doctor. He is Chairman of the digestive and endocrine surgery at the University Hospital, Strasbourg.

Biography 
 1948: Born in Clermont
 1971: Major in the contest for the Internat
 1977: Doctor in surgery
 1980: He obtained a chair professor at the Universities digestive surgery. He was only 33 years old.
 1989 - 1992: Director of special education Visceral surgery at the Medical School of Strasbourg.
 1989 - 1992: Vice President of the regional council of the Inserm.
 Since 1989: Head of digestive and endocrine surgery University Hospitals of Strasbourg.
 Since 1994: Founding Director of the IRCAD and the EITS
 On September 7, 2001, he made New York a world first in TeleSurgery operating in the gallbladder of a patient who was in Strasbourg. This was the Lindbergh Operation.
 Since 2002: Founding member of WeBSurg
 In March 2005, he participated, with prestigious colleagues: Pierre Chambon, Jean-Marie Lehn, Pascal Neuville and Charles Woler, the draft pole of competitiveness "Innovation Therapeutics", in the context of Alsace BioValley.
 On April 2, 2007, he is believed to be the first in the world to operate a person without leaving a scar, removing the gallbladder of a patient older than 30 years without making incision of the skin and through a natural orifice.

References 

Academic staff of the University of Strasbourg
French surgeons
Living people
1948 births
Officers of the Ordre national du Mérite
Commandeurs of the Légion d'honneur